Pea Ridge is an unincorporated community in Washington County, North Carolina, United States, on the south side of the Albemarle Sound near the Albemarle Sound Bridge.

References

External links 
 Community profile
 Topographic Map from TopoQuest
 Pea Ridge-A Place in Transition

Unincorporated communities in Washington County, North Carolina
Unincorporated communities in North Carolina